St Luke's railway station was a railway station in Southport, Merseyside.

History
It opened by the Lancashire & Yorkshire Railway on 2 July 1883 as Barton Street, serving the route from Southport Chapel Street to Wigan. It was then renamed three months later as Southport St Luke's Road.

On 1 March 1902, the station was renamed again as Southport St Luke's, and in June of that year it began serving the Preston line, absorbing the adjacent Southport Ash Street railway station. The two platforms were almost at right angles to each other, both separated by a road named Hart Street. They did, however, share the same ticket office, located on the street at St Luke's Road.

On 22 March 1904 the Preston line was electrified all the way up to Crossens, and enabled a regular service to stop at St Luke's. In May 1914, the station was finally named St Luke's.

Decline and closure
Trains to Preston (including the Crossens electric shuttle) ended when the line was closed on 7 September 1964, a victim of the Beeching Axe.  However the station did not close as some trains bound for Wigan still used part of the route.  The direct line to Wigan then closed on 14 June 1965 with trains being diverted via Meols Cop and a section of the old branch line to Altcar to allow the closure of the busy level crossing at Blowick.  The end of St Luke's station came when the Preston platform, still serving a number of trains, finally closed on 9 September 1968.

Today, the site of the Wigan platforms have been built over with a modern housing development, but the tracks widen at a point where the Preston platform used to stand and can be clearly seen by passing trains.

References

 Gell, Rob (1986). An Illustrated Survey of Railway Stations Between Southport & Liverpool 1848-1986. Heyday Publishing Company, .
 Marshall, John (1981) Forgotten Railways North-West England, David & Charles (Publishers) Ltd, Newton Abbott. .

External links 
 Disused Stations Site Record - St. Lukes

Disused railway stations in the Metropolitan Borough of Sefton
Former Lancashire and Yorkshire Railway stations
Railway stations in Great Britain opened in 1883
Railway stations in Great Britain closed in 1968
Buildings and structures in Southport